Saratoga Springs station is a train station owned by the Capital District Transportation Authority and operated by Amtrak in Saratoga Springs, New York. It is situated along the Canadian Pacific Railway.

Saratoga Springs is served by Amtrak's Adirondack and  Ethan Allen Express, in addition to the Saratoga & North Creek Railway's two heritage lines. The station has one low-level side platform to the east of the tracks.

History

The current station was built in 1956-1959 by the Delaware & Hudson Railway, as a replacement for an 1880-built structure at another location, which currently serves as a private residence. The 1950s-era structure was mostly torn down in 2002, and a temporary trailer was used as the station until the current station was completed in 2004. The brick exterior from the former structure was retained and covered with wooden facing high across the front and green trim on the doors and windows the rest of the building was rebuilt into a modern, high-ceilinged facility with a skylight in the center of the station.
The facade features a 54-foot frieze by Anne Diggory, Alice Manzi, and Beverly Mastrianni.

References

External links

Amtrak stations in New York (state)
Former Delaware and Hudson Railway stations
Buildings and structures in Saratoga Springs, New York
Transportation in Capital District (New York)
Transportation buildings and structures in Saratoga County, New York
Railway stations in the United States opened in 1956
1956 establishments in New York (state)